Two elections in New York's 29th district were held on November 2, 2010. The candidates vied to replace Eric Massa, who resigned the seat on March 8, 2010 as a result of health issues and allegations of sexual harassment.

The Governor called for a special election to be held simultaneously with the general election on the same day, with the special election determining who would complete the remainder of Massa's unexpired term in the 111th United States Congress (from November 2010 to January 2011) and the general election determining who would serve in the 112th United States Congress.

Republican Thomas W. Reed, Jr., the former mayor of Corning, New York, defeated Democrat Matthew Zeller and write-in candidate Janice Volk.

Background
Democrat Eric J. Massa won this district by 1.8 percentage points in 2008 over then-two-term incumbent John "Randy" Kuhl. The district leaned Republican (CPVI R+5), supported John McCain over Barack Obama in the 2008 presidential election by a 51-48 margin, and—accounting for redistricting—had been held by a Republicans for almost a century, except for Democrat Stan Lundine's time representing the area in the 1970s and 1980s. At the time of his resignation, Massa had raised over $600,000 in campaign funds. The NRCC targeted Massa for voting in favor of the Recovery and Reinvestment Act.

On March 3, 2010, following allegations of sexual harassment and reports that he had suffered a recurrence of cancer, Massa announced that he would retire at the end of his term. Massa later announced his resignation effective March 8.<ref>Benjamin, Elizabeth (March 3, 2010). Dem Source: Massa Won't Run (Updatedx2) . New York Daily News: The Daily Politics.</ref>

On April 23, 2010, Steuben County Republican chairman Bill Hatch announced that he would file a lawsuit that, if successful, would force Governor David Paterson to acknowledge the vacancy and call a special election in the immediate future. Clause I.2.4 of the U.S. Constitution requires the governor of a state to issue a "writ of election" for any congressional vacancy. The judge hearing the case denied a motion from the Paterson administration to dismiss the lawsuit on May 13.

On May 12, 2010, Paterson announced that he would set the special election for November 2, 2010, and would not issue the required writ of election until October. Paterson's decision resulted in the general election and the special election occurring on the same day, with the winner of the special election serving until January 2011 and the winner of the general election serving from January 2011 until 2013. Furthermore, the redundant election complicated the primary election process; it was theoretically possible for either Reed or Zeller to be defeated in the primary election in mid-September, but to then remain on the ballot for the special election. In addition, state law dictates that special elections cannot be held for vacancies acknowledged after July 1, except in special circumstances. Following the announcement, Angelo Campini, who was challenging Reed in the primary election, stated that he would consider joining the lawsuit or filing one of his own over the date of the election if it resulted in him being pushed off the ballot.

Judge David Larimer issued a ruling in the case on June 4, 2010, officially acknowledging the vacancy but declining to compel Paterson to call a special election before November 2. The plaintiffs considered an appeal, but decided against it.

Candidates

Democratic party
The Democratic Party chose Matthew Zeller, a 28-year-old CIA analyst who had not lived in New York since he had left for war, as their candidate. Zeller was an ROTC-trained Army officer who served in Afghanistan and holds master's degrees in international relations and public administration.

Nominee
Matthew Zeller, former CIA analyst and Afghanistan veteran

Not running
John Batiste, retired Major General
Sandra Frankel, town supervisor of Brighton, former lieutenant governor candidate
Mike Green, Monroe County District Attorney
Shawn Hogan, mayor of Hornell
David Koon, assemblyman
Barbara Lifton, assemblywoman from Ithacahttp://www.theithacajournal.com/article/20100308/NEWS01/3080369 
Michael McCormick, former Allegany County legislator, instead ran for State Senate and lost
David Nachbar, Massa's 2008 primary opponent, Bausch & Lomb executive (speculated), instead ran for Assembly and lost to Sean Hanna
Ellen Polimeni, mayor of Canandaigua
David Rose, teacher in the Henrietta-Rush School District
John Tonello, mayor of Elmira (speculated)
Mary Wilmot, regional director for the Paterson administration, heir to the Wilmorite fortune, instead ran for State Senate and lost

Republican party

Nominee
Tom Reed, former mayor of Corning

Not running or eliminated
Angelo Campini, pizza shop owner from Henrietta  Failed to deliver petitions to get onto the primary ballot. After proposing a write-in campaign, Campini bowed out on September 30, 2010, endorsing Reed.
Janice Volk, Cuba resident, alpaca farmer and black conservative community activistMiller, Rick (June 13, 2010). Volk launches bid for Congress. Olean Times Herald. Retrieved 2010-06-13. Submitted 1,400 signatures to secure primary ballot, but those petitions were challenged. Though Volk later announced plans to seek a third-party line, she was unable to do so. Volk remained in the race through a write-in campaign.
Maggie Brooks, county executive of Monroe County
Brian Kolb, Minority Leader of the New York State Assembly
Randy Kuhl, former congressman and state senator
Catharine Young, state senator

Independence Party

Tom Reed, Republican nominee

Conservative Party
Tom Reed, Republican nominee

Working Families Party
Matthew Zeller, Democratic nominee

Campaign fundraising
At the time of Massa's resignation, the lone announced candidate, Tom Reed, had approximately $120,000 cash on hand. According to Reed, "in our last report, we raised $233,000."

As of the first quarter of 2010, Reed has raised $481,879 and had $287,222 cash on hand.

As of July 2010, Volk had not yet raised enough funds to need to file with the Federal Election Commission, which would indicate less than $5,000 in fundraising and/or spending. Reed raised $686,449 by that point, approximately $100,000 from his own account, while Zeller had raised $137,885.

As of September 2010, Reed had raised $809,464 and had $361,315 in cash on hand. Zeller raised $232,425 and had $50,418 in cash on hand.

With Reed heavily favored, he donated $75,000 of his campaign money to the National Republican Congressional Committee and the New York Senate Republican Committee less than one week before the election.

Endorsements

Tom Reed
James Alesi, state senator
James Bacalles, assemblyman and former mayor of Corning
Amo Houghton, former representative
Randy Kuhl, former representative
Bill Paxon, former representative
George Winner, state senator
Catharine Young, state senator
Angelo Campini, potential primary challenger
Rochester Democrat and Chronicle
Messenger-Post Newspapers (Canandaigua, NY)
The Leader (Corning, NY)

Matthew Zeller

Louise Slaughter, Member of Congress
Shawn Hogan, Mayor of Hornell, NY
The Buffalo News
1199SEIU United Healthcare Workers East
Finger Lakes Times (Geneva, NY)

Janice Volk
Jim Ostrowski, 1994 Libertarian Party gubernatorial candidate and WNY Tea Party Coalition Co-Founder
Amy McManus/Amy Mikolajczyk, talk show host on WLEA out of Hornell, NY and future Hornell city council candidate
David Chamberlain, Village of Cuba, NY Mayor (1990–1995)

Polling

Results
Reed won both elections by margins of 56%-44%. Reed, for the first time since Amo Houghton in 2002, won every county in the district. However, he lost his home city of Corning, as well as the city of Hornell. All write-ins, including (but not exclusively) Volk's, totaled 527 votes for the general and 510 for the special, less than 0.3% of the vote.

References
Specific

General
 Politics Now: Reed gains Paxon's support for Massa seat. The Buffalo News. March 5, 2010.

External links
New York State Board of Elections
Official candidate list (general election) 
U.S. Congress candidates for New York at Project Vote Smart
NY - District 29 from OurCampaigns.com
House - New York from the Cook Political ReportRace ranking and details from CQ Politics
Campaign contributions from OpenSecrets
Race profile at The New York Times''
Official campaign sites
Campini for Congress
Reed for Congress
Volk for Congress
Zeller for Congress

New York 2010 29
New York 2010 29
2010 29 Special
New York 29 Special
United States House of Representatives 29 Special
United States House of Representatives 2010 29